Bob Bryant may refer to:

 Roscoe Rustling Bob Bryant (d. 1878), American outlaw
 Bob Bryant (tackle) (1918–2000), American football player
 Bob Bryant (end) (born 1937), American football player
 Bob Bryant (politician) (1944–2016), American politician
 Bob Bryant, stuntman and actor, was in Curse of the Faceless Man (1958)

See also
Robert Bryant (disambiguation)
Bobby Bryant (disambiguation)